Sauze may refer to:

 Sauze (band), alternative/power metal band from Asturias, Spain
 Sauze, Alpes-Maritimes, commune in the Alpes-Maritimes department in southeastern France
 Sauze di Cesana, comune in the Metropolitan City of Turin, Piedmont, Italy
 Sauze d'Oulx, town and comune in the Metropolitan City of Turin, Piedmont, Italy
 Sauzé-Vaussais, commune in the Deux-Sèvres department in western France